The 2011 ICC European Twenty20 Championship Division One was a cricket tournament that took place between 19 and 24 July 2011. It forms part of the European Cricket Championship. Jersey and the Guernsey hosted the event.

Teams
Teams that qualified are as follows:

Group A

Group B

Squads

Fixtures

Group stage

Group A

Group B

Play-offs

5th-place play-off semi-final

5th-place play-off semi-final

9th-place play-off semi-final

9th-place play-off semi-final

Semi-final

Semi-final

11th-place play-off

3rd-place play-off

5th-place play-off

7th-place play-off

9th-place play-off

Final

Final Placings

Statistics

Most runs
The top five highest run scorers (total runs) are included in this table.

Most wickets
The following table contains the five leading wicket-takers.

See also

2012 ICC World Twenty20 Qualifier
European Cricket Championship

References

2012 ICC World Twenty20
International cricket competitions in 2011
European Cricket Championship
2011 in Guernsey
2011 in Jersey
International cricket competitions in Guernsey
International cricket competitions in Jersey